Tamil Nadu Small Industries Corporation Limited (TANSI) is a state-government undertaking of Government of Tamil Nadu located in the Indian state of Tamil Nadu.

Formation of TANSI
  The Tamil Nadu Small Industries Corporation Limited, popularly known as TANSI was formed on 1.12.1965 (registered under Companies Act, 1956) to take over the small scale units that were set up and run by the Department of Industries and Commerce, total numbered 64
 In next phase TANSI started some new units after formation
 In 1985 TANSI started Tamil Nadu Paints And Allied Products Limited (TAPAP)(a subsidiary company) with a Small Chemicals Unit in Ambttur, Thiruvallur for the need of Tamil Nadu Government & its organisation
 The TAPAP Ambttur Unit commenced production on 1 April 1986.

TANSI Group Products

TANSI:
 Wooden & Steel Furniture Products
 Wooden & Steel Furnishing and Interior Decorations
 Metal Fabricated Products
 Engineering / Structural / Galvanizing / Boiler - Products and services
 Engineering / Tools / Foundry - Products and services
 Pumps & Spares and Street Light Poles
 Polish Chemicals

TAPAP:
 Paints

TANSI Operation
Functioning Units of TANSI are:

TANSI Wooden Furniture Units

 Furniture Works, Guindy
 Furniture Works, Pudukkottai
 Furniture Works, Madurai
 Furniture Works, Krishnagiri
 Furniture & Engg. Works, Pettai.
 Furniture Works, Cuddalore.

TANSI Steel Furniture/ Fabrication Units

 Fabrication works, Palani
 Fabrication works, Vellore
 Fabrication Works, Rajapalayam

TANSI Structural Units
 Structural Units:
 Structural &  Galvanizing Works, Metturdam
 Structural Works, Trichy
 Engineering Units:
 Tool  & Engineering Works, Madurai
 Engineering Works, Thanjavur
 Engineering works, Mayiladuthurai

TANSI Special Units

 Pump Unit, Ambattur
 Tool & Engg works, Trichy
 Polish Unit, Ambattur
 Watch Assembly Unit, Ooty

TANSI Project Cells

 Project Cell, Guindy
 Project Cell, Ambattur
 Project Cell, Mettur Dam
 Project Cell, Mayiladuthurai
 Project Cell, Thanjavur

TANSI Sales Centres

 Chennai
 Coimbatore
 Madurai
 Trichy

TAPAP Operation

Tamil Nadu Paints & Allied Products Ltd is a subsidiary company  of Tamil Nadu Small Industries Corporation Limited (TANSI). Tamil Nadu Paints & Allied Products Ltd is manufacturer of "ARASU" Brand Paint and Allied Products

 TAPAP Manufacturing Location - Ambattur,  Tiruvallur District

References

External links 
 www.tansi.tn.gov.in TANSI - Official Website
 

State agencies of Tamil Nadu
Companies based in Chennai
Small-scale industry in India
State industrial development corporations of India
Indian companies established in 1965
1965 establishments in Madras State